Leo clubs are a youth organization of Lions Clubs International.

Leo clubs encourage youths to develop leadership qualities by participating in social service activities. They are dependent on a Lions club to sponsor and initiate a Leo club. Leo club members are addressed as "Leos." They conduct various projects in the fields of health care, elders, children, disabled people, literacy and education, and self-development. Leos can raise funds by conducting fund-raising projects. They can conduct projects with another Leo club, sponsoring Lions club, or with an outside organization. Leo clubs are sponsored by Lions clubs and comprise an official program of Lions Clubs International.

History 
The first Leo club was founded in 1957 by Jim Graver, the coach of the Abington High School, Pennsylvania baseball team.  He was an active member of the Glenside Lions Club. The club was founded with the help of William Ernst, another Lion. It adopted the high school's colors of maroon and gold. The club also created the acronym Leadership, Equality, Opportunity for the word Leo. The word equality was later changed to experience.

In 1964 the Leo Club Program became a sponsored program of the Lions Clubs International. It grew beyond Pennsylvania and the United States of America. By 1967 the program had grown to over 200 clubs in 18 countries and become an official youth program of Lions Clubs International. In the following year, the Leo Club Program spread rapidly, resulting in 918 clubs in 48 countries by the end of 1968.

Alpha and Omega Leo Clubs 

There are two tracks of the Leo Club Program. Alpha Leo clubs are those that consist of members between 12 and 18 years of age. Omega Leo clubs are those that consist of members between 18 and 30 years of age.
The Leo Club Program's maximum age of membership is 30 years of age, though it is at the discretion of the Lion's district to enforce younger upper-age limits for Omega clubs. There are no major differences in the operations or logistics of Alpha and Omega Leo Clubs.

References

External links 

Lions Clubs International
Youth organizations based in Illinois